Assam Rajiv Gandhi University of Cooperative Management (ARGUCOM) is a state university located in Sivasagar, Assam, India. Established under the Assam Rajiv Gandhi University of Cooperative Management Act, 2010, it is the first cooperative management university in the India.

The University, set up at Sivsagar in  Upper Assam, is a teaching, residential university.

Academics 
The University has five schools - School of Entrepreneurship and Management, School of Innovation and Technology, School of Culture and Media, School of Public Policy and Law, besides the School of Ecology and Sustenance.

Rankings and reputation 
The university won the trophy for the ‘Best Govt Initiative at the World Education Summit, 2015.

References

External links 

Universities in Assam
Cooperatives in India
Sivasagar
2010 establishments in Assam
Educational institutions established in 2010

State universities in Assam